Puçuq (also, Pucuq, Puçub, and Puchuk) is a village in the Quba Rayon of Azerbaijan. The village forms part of the municipality of Gömürdəhnə.

References

External links

Populated places in Quba District (Azerbaijan)